The Big Cage is a 1933 American pre-Code circus film starring Clyde Beatty and Anita Page, and featuring Raymond Hatton, Wallace Ford, Andy Devine and Mickey Rooney, with Walter Brennan and Louise Beavers in bit parts. It was originally released by Universal Pictures.

The movie was the film debut of Beatty, whose skills as an animal trainer in circuses had brought him fame since his late teens and made him a national celebrity. As in his three subsequent films, he plays a fictionalized version of himself, also named Clyde Beatty. The movie proved to be one of the studio's most popular releases in 1933 and was reissued several times in second-run theaters into the early 1950s.

See also
 Tiger versus lion

References

External links

1933 films
1933 drama films
American black-and-white films
American drama films
Circus films
Films directed by Kurt Neumann
Universal Pictures films
1930s English-language films
1930s American films